Olakunle Junior Olusegun (born 23 April 2002) is a Nigerian football player who plays for Russian club FC Krasnodar.

Club career
In August 2021 his rights were purchased by Bulgarian club Botev Plovdiv who immediately loaned him to FC Krasnodar-2 in Russia for the 2021–22 season.

He made his debut in the Russian Football National League for Krasnodar-2 on 29 August 2021 in a game against FC Baltika Kaliningrad.

In April 2022, Olusegun was promoted to the main squad of FC Krasnodar and made his Russian Premier League debut on 3 April 2022 in a game against FC Dynamo Moscow.

On 14 June 2022, Olusegun transferred to Krasnodar on a permanent basis and signed a four-year contract with the club.

International career
He represented Nigeria at the 2019 Africa U-17 Cup of Nations, where he scored a goal against Angola, and at the 2019 FIFA U-17 World Cup, where he scored in their Round of 16 1–3 loss to the Netherlands.

Career statistics

References

External links
 
 Profile by Russian Football National League

2002 births
People from Ilorin
Living people
Nigerian footballers
Nigeria youth international footballers
Association football forwards
Fremad Amager players
FC Krasnodar-2 players
FC Krasnodar players
Danish 1st Division players
Russian First League players
Russian Premier League players
Nigerian expatriate footballers
Expatriate men's footballers in Denmark
Nigerian expatriate sportspeople in Denmark
Expatriate footballers in Russia
Nigerian expatriate sportspeople in Russia